The Deserta Grande Island is the main island of the Desertas Islands archipelago, a small chain of three islands in the Portuguese Madeira Islands Archipelago of Macaronesia. 

Nature reserve
The island is part of the Desertas Islands nature reserve, with a warden's base midway along the western coast. 

South of the base, no approach to the island closer than 100 m is permitted in order to protect the critically endangered Mediterranean monk seal breeding population. Access is permitted to the north of the nature base.  Some activities, such as line and spear fishing, are banned.

The large, critically endangered wolf spider Hogna ingens is endemic to Deserta Grande.

The island has breeding Cory's shearwaters, Bulwer's petrels and Madeiran storm-petrels.

See also
Bugio Island
Ilhéu Chão — Chão islet.

References

External links

Desertas Islands, Grande
Former populated places in Madeira
Desertas Islands, Grande